India International can refer to:

 India International Centre
 India International Challenge
 India International Convention and Expo Centre
 India International Exchange
 India International Film Festival
 India International Friendship Society
 India International Insurance
 India International Science Festival
 India International Trade Fair
 Miss India International

Education
 India International School in Japan
 India International School (Kuwait)